Diede de Groot and Aniek van Koot defeated the defending champions Yui Kamiji and Jordanne Whiley  in the final, 6–1, 6–2 to win the women's doubles wheelchair tennis title at the 2021 US Open.

Seeds

Draw

Finals

References

External links 
 Draw

Wheelchair Women's Doubles
U.S. Open, 2021 Women's Doubles